David Vahtangovich Kutaliya (Russian: Давид Вахтангович Куталия) was a Russian lawyer and prosecutor's office employee. He specialised in investigations resolving and preventing grave crimes and was a supervisor concerning law execution by authorities conducting operational-search measures and preliminary investigations.

Biography 
David Vahtangovich Kutaliya was born 6 February 1966 in Sukhumi, Abkhazia, Azerbaijan Soviet Socialist Republic to a public service family. He was named after David Meskhi, who served in a jury court. From 1972 to 1983, Kutaliya studied at secondary school Shota Rustaveli No. 1 in town of Gagra and graduated with honours. Afterwards, he studied English in his hometown finishing with MSIIR. Ensuing his English studies, he applied for the university in the city Saint Petersburg (formerly Leningrad) and town Solnechnogorsk, where he studied alongside L.A. Kirillova, the mother of avant-garde painter I.A. Kirillova.

In 1983, he entered the faculty of law (evening classes) of the Leningrad order of Vladimir Lenin and the red banner of Labor State University named after A.A. Zhdanov, graduating in 1989, majoring in jurisprudence. He defended his thesis titled "British government during the bourgois revolution (1640-1642 period". He holds a PhD in law. The main lectures on criminology were given by Doctor of Law, Professor A.I. Bastrykin.

Between 1983 and 1989, he worked in the UPR-10 construction trust N20 of Glavleningradstroy as a transport labourer, scaffolding worker, and bricklayer. He was Deputy Secretary of the AULYCL Bureau, chief of the DND trust, member of the Kirov district OKOD. In February 1988 by General meeting decision of the management No. 10 admitted as a member of the Communist Party of the Soviet Union. Recommendations for entry into the ranks of the party were given by construction foreman V.I. Moskalev and party Secretary of Management V. Makarov.

Service in procuratory agencies 
After graduating from LSU, he entered the service into the agencies of the Prosecutor's office of USSR. During the period of his service he was directed to various Soviet republics and regions of the Russian Federation to carry out special tasks, including in "hot spots". Promoted with rights of the Prosecutor general of the USSR and Prosecutor general of Russian Federation. Incurred no penalties. From 1997 to 2007, successively held the positions of Intern, investigator, senior investigator in the Baltic transport branch of the North-Western transport Prosecutor's office. At the same time he gave lectures to students of the faculty of law of the academy of civil aviation in criminal law and criminology.

Continued to serve in the St. Petersburg Prosecutor's office as Prosecutor-criminalist, Deputy-prosecutor of St. Petersburg's Nevsky district, senior Prosecutor-criminalist, acting head of the Department of criminology, where from 1998 to 2001, he worked under the direct supervision of N.A. Vinnichenko, and A.V. Konovalov from 2001 to 2005. In November–December 2000 David Vahtangovich took advanced training refresher courses in the St. Petersburg law Institute of the Prosecutor General of the Russian Federation, specializing in «The use of forensic technology and specific support for investigation of crimes». He was recognized as the leading Prosecutor-criminalist in a memo from acting head of the Department of criminology of the Russian Federation V.N. Isaenko, who was conducting an audit of the forensic units in the North-West Federal district, was considered the best Prosecutor-criminologist.

Oshski events 
In 1990, conducted investigation of criminal cases in the cities of Osh and Uzgen as part of the Investigative group of the USSR Prosecutor's office and independently. Investigated criminal cases on the ethnic conflict in the region of the Kirghiz SSR between the Kirghiz and Uzbek peoples (Oshski events). Investigative work was carried out in the Uzbek and Kazakh SSR regions as well.

Terrorist act against the Deputy of the state council of Dagestan 
In 1992 he was sent to Makhachkala city as part of the joint investigative group of the Prosecutor's office, where the Ministry of Internal Affairs and Federal Counterintelligence Service of the Russian Federation was investigating the 13 February 1992 terrorist attack on chief doctor of the Republican diagnostic center M.M. Suleymanov, member of the Parliament of Dagestan.

Ossetian-Ingush conflict and hostage-taking 
In autumn 1992, by order of Deputy Prosecutor General of the Russian Federation E.K. Lisov, he arrived in North Ossetia for the investigation of criminal cases initiated in connection with the ethno-political conflict in Prigorodny district of North Ossetia (Russian Federation) territory, which led to the 30 October — 4 November 1992 armed clashes and multiple victims of the Ossetian and Ingush population. He was captured and held hostage in the Turk-Chernorechensky area by unidentified men armed with grenades and assault rifles, together with individuals who were listed as victims in the criminal case. The condition put forth by the perpetrators: voluntarily hand over the victims – elderly Ingush people, who they were going to execute, in exchange for safe passage to the investigative team's location, together with doctor of the Nazran city hospital V.I. Dino (an ethnic German), accompanying D.V. Kutaliya as forensic medical examiner. Both the investigator and the doctor refused. Released together with all hostages by Alpha Special Forces unit with participation of А.A. Kotenkov, who personally went to the scene of the crime.

Explosion aboard a vessel of the Navy’s yacht club 55 
In June 1993, he initiated and investigated a criminal case on the Gulf of Finland explosion aboard the "Orlan" vessel, belonging to the Navy's yacht club 55, with former secretary of State under the President of the Russian Federation G.E. Burbulis and other individuals aboard at the time.

Larionov Brothers Case 
In 1994–1996, as part of the Investigations unit of the Prosecutor General of the Russian Federation in Vladivostok, D. V. Kutaliya investigated the criminal case of the Larionov brothers gang – one of the largest and most highly organized OPG's since the beginning of the 1990s. Awarded with lapel badge of the Operational-search UR ATC Primorsky district directorate.

Met with columnist of the newspaper «Izvestia» I.V. Korolkov during the assignment, who devoted several pages to him in his book. On the basis of case materials, a documentary film was shot by director Andrey Karpenko, as part of the «Criminal Russia» series. The film shows original footage of the band's chief hitman Mikhail Sokolov's interrogation by head investigator D.V. Kutaliya in the Federal Detention Center 1. Particulars of the criminal case were used by Professor V.L. Vasiliev in his "Legal psychology" textbook to describe the psychological workings of an organized crime group, as well as the conflicts and contradictions that arise within gang structures.

Investigation of criminal cases against the former Prime Minister of North Ossetia-Alania and Government officials 
In 2006, he investigated criminal cases against the former Prime Minister of the Government of the Republic of North Ossetia, who fully confessed to the malfeasance charges presented, as well as the head of administration of the President and the Government, who personally and through his defendants in Moscow held lengthy negotiations between the aforementioned Prime Minister, and Deputy Prosecutor General of the Russian Federation V. Kolesnikov on the conclusion of a pre-trial arrangement. During the course of investigations the team received accurate information about the mining of one of the Vladikavkaz bridges, which, in particular, was used by D.V. Kutaliya to walk to work, that was supposed to explode at a time he was on it. Counter-intelligence agents of North Ossetia-Alania disarmed the explosive device. Due to the transfer of V.I. Kolesnikov to the Ministry of justice, the investigative team was disbanded and D.V. Kutaliya was sent to Moscow for further investigation of criminal cases related to smuggling, and with respect to the founders and directors of "Evroset", before the case was concluded. 
On 26 October 2006 by order of the Prosecutor General of the Russian Federation D. V. Kutaliya was awarded the «Honorary serviceman of the Prosecutor of the Russian Federation» badge for perseverance and professionalism demonstrated during the investigation of criminal cases.

In April 2007 he was appointed to post of Deputy Head of department for supervision over investigation of particularly significant cases - as head of the department for supervision over procedural activities of the Central office of the Prosecutor General within the investigation of corruption crimes in the economic sphere of the Prosecutor General of the Russian Federation, as part of the transfer from the St. Petersburg Prosecutor's office.

In September 2007 appointed as Deputy head of the department for supervision over the investigation of criminal cases in the Central apparatus of the Investigative Committee Procuracy of the Russian Federation, with the Russian Interior Ministry, Federal drug control service of Russia, Federal Bailiff Service of Russia and the Federal Customs Service of the Prosecutor General of the Russian Federation — the head of the second department for supervision over investigation of criminal cases in the Investigative Committee of the Procuracy of the Russian Federation, and later the Investigative Committee of the Russian Federation. Assistant attorney General of the Russian Federation.

On 17 January 2008, by order of the Prosecutor General of the Russian Federation, he was awarded with «For loyalty to law» II degree insignia badge for the continued exemplary fulfilment of official duties, and faultless service within the bodies of the Prosecutor's office.

Murder of the prosecutor of Saratov region 
In March 2008, under the chairmanship of the Volga district court of Saratov - A.G. Paramonov, supported the petition of investigator for particularly important cases V.P. Ribalkin of the Investigative Committee under the Prosecutor's Office of the Russian Federation on the selection of a measure of restraint in the form of detention against the organizers and executors of the murder of Saratov region public Prosecutor E. F. Grigoriev.
By the decree of the President of the Russian Federation dated 9 June 2008 No.904 was awarded the rank of state advisor of justice 3rd class.

Murder of A.M. Magomedtagirov  
In the summer of 2009, after study and analysis of criminal evidence, results of the OSA, as well as visit to site of the Ministry of internal affairs A.M. Magomedtagirov murder committed on 5 June 2009, made a report, in the FSB Counterterrorism center of the Russian Federation, located near the town of Makhachkala to the General Prosecutor of the Russian Federation Y.Y. Chaika, Minister of Internal Affairs of Russia R.G. Nurgaliev, Chairman of the Investigative Committee of the Prosecutor's office of Russian Federation A.I. Bastrikin and other colleagues, expressing his point of view on the future direction of the preliminary investigation.

Spanish "Troika" operation 
By order of the Prosecutor General of Russian Federation Y.Y. Chaika was sent to the Royal Anti-corruption Prosecutor’ office in Spain (Madrid) to participate in negotiations with Spanish colleagues, investigating criminal cases against former citizens of the USSR and the Russian Federation, detained during operation code name "Troika".

Pirate attack on the 'Arctic Sea' motor vessel

D. V. Kutaliya participated in the criminal investigation on the pirate seizure of the «Arctic Sea» cargo ship in 2009. 
The case was complicated by the lack of established practices and lack of actual information at the time of the decision to initiate criminal proceedings. At the same time David Vahtangovich's previous work experience at the Baltic transport Prosecutor's office and knowledge of the UN Convention on the Law of the Sea and other agreements in the field of international maritime law were taken into consideration. 
The crime was resolved and pirates neutralized in the open sea thanks to the cooperation of the Russian Federation FSB and Ministry of Defence. Several European countries also opened parallel criminal investigations into the capture of «Arctic Sea». During the course of the case resolution by the Prosecutor General of the Russian Federatin Y.Y. Chaika, David Kutaliya was commandeered to Eurojust (Hague, Holland) and the Finland State Security Police (Helsinki), at the invitation of foreign colleagues.

Attempt to discredit, preliminary investigation and court decision 
In 2009, the Main Investigation Department of the Investigative Committee under the Prosecutor's Office of the Russian Federation conducted a preliminary investigation to verify facts about Deputy head of the department for supervision over investigation of particularly significant cases of the Russian Federation David Kutaliya, as set out in articles "How much money did David Kutaliya make on raider seizures" and "Is David Vahtangovich Kutaliya ready to answer the inquiry’s questions?", published in the electronic version of «The Moscow Post» in July–August 2009. During the course of investigation, facts of the crimes allegedly committed by employee of the Prosecutor General Kutaliya were not substantiated. In this regard, a ruling on the refusal to initiate criminal proceeding was passed. On 15 October 2009 Federal judge of the Izmailovsky district court of Moscow I.V. Sukhanova ruled on the claim toward "The Moscow Post" electronic newspaper, wherein the information disseminated on the Internet via the "Russian public-political online newspaper "The Moscow Post" was deemed not corresponding to reality, discrediting the honor, dignity and business reputation of Kutaliya David Vahtangovich. In doing so, the court also ordered the periodical to publish a public refutal on the newspaper's website, and sought a total of 75 000 in the name of the plaintiff, which D.V. Kutaliya requested to transfer to one of the orphanages of the same district in his statement of claim. Neither the article's author Sergey Nerestov (false pseudonym), nor representatives of the editorial board, or their legal representatives were present at the court hearing. The editorial board could not be located at the registered address.

The court decision entered into force, but is still not fulfilled.

Case on the raider seizures of enterprises and real estate in St. Petersburg 
After contacting the FSB Director of Russia, on behalf of the leadership of the Prosecutor General of the Russian Federation, D.V. Kutaliya, together with the Director General at the Judicial Department under the Supreme Court of the Russian Federation A.V. Gusev, took care of organizational and technical security matters of executing the field session of the Kuibyshev regional court of St. Petersburg in the Moscow city court pertaining to facts of illegal seizures of enterprises and real estate in St. Petersburg, committed by an organized group under the leadership of Vladimir Barsukov (Kumarin) and Vyacheslav Drokov. In addition, the prosecutor directly subordinated to him supported the state allegations towards the individuals aforementioned.

Dismissal from the Prosecutor’s services 
Two years later, in November 2011 relieved of his post and dismissed at his own request by the order of Prosecutor General of the Russian Federation Y.Y. Chaika due to retirement after years of service in the Prosecutor's office.
Is currently a retired member of the Russian Federation Prosecutor's service.

Community work 
From 2002, he was an active member of the Russian geographical society (RGO). In the period from 2002 to 2009 was part of the RGO board of trustees. On 1 June 2004 he was awarded the Gold medal "For merit" of Grand Duke Konstantin Nikolaevich (RGO). 
On 22 April 2016 in the city of Moscow, the Interregional public organization «Outstanding generals and naval commanders of the Fatherland», headed by former Prosecutor General of the USSR A. Y. Sukharev, decided to award D.V. Kutaliya the medal "For loyalty to the Fatherland" No.0011.

Family 
David Kutaliya's father — Vahtang Abramovich Kutaliya (8 April 1928 – 7 December 2004), a native of Gali city of the Abkhazian Autonomous Soviet Socialist Republic, graduated the Georgian Agricultural institute named after L.P. Beria in 1953, specializing in «Horticulture and viticulture»  (qualification — agronomical scientist), worked as senior industrial engineer at the factory, is a veteran of labor.
Mother — Dalila Noewna Kutaliya (née Asatiani), (7 June 1945 - 11 April 2017), graduated from the Sukhumi State Music School named after D.I. Arakishvili with «Conductor of the choir» specialty, taught solfeggio and musical literature at the Children's music Studio. For years of diligent work was awarded the «Veteran of labor» medal.

Brother — Teimuraz Vahtangovich Kutaliya, born 18 April 1967, graduated from the Leningrad Institute of Soviet Trade named after F. Engels in 1988, practiced judo, presently enjoys the triathlon, entrepreneur in the field on construction and sport (tennis).

Paternal grandfather – Abram Malkhazovich Kutaliya (30 October 1903 – 16 May 1984), the grandson of an orthodox priest, was named after the biblical Abraham character, had higher economic and legal education, served in the office of the investigator of the military Prosecutor of ZAKVO and the bodies of justice of the Georgian SSR.

Grandmother – Ketevan Davidovna Meskhi (23 April 1904 – 27 December 1978), graduated from the Kutaisi classical gymnasium, worked in the Central Archival Administration of Tbilisi (ancient manuscripts department).

Grandfather on mother's side – Noah Feofanovich Asatiani (8 February 1911– 2 May 1985), captain of the Red Army, veteran of the Great Patriotic War, reached Berlin, chief of broadcasting centre, later chief engineer of the Sukhumi port. His older brother Gedevan Asatiani, judoka, pilot, member of the French Resistance Movement, citizen of the French republic, was a friend of the French writer and professional aviator Antoine de Saint-Exupery. He was buried at the cemetery of Saint-Cloud in Paris.

Grandmother – Helena Selivestrovna Maisaya (28 March 1919 – 28 August 2004), served in the Blagoveshensk Cathedral of the city of Sukhumi.

Single.

Hobbies and interests 
Enjoys history, archeology, Orient studies, Causasian studies, Philology, Ethnography, linguistics, architecture, folk and classical jazz music (Jelly Roll Morton, Willie Smith, Fats Waller etc.), film and stereophotography. Studying technical English. Favorite place for vacation – the mountains of Abkhazia. Is not a public person.

References

1966 births
Living people
Lawyers from Saint Petersburg
Saint Petersburg State University alumni